The 5th Lux Style Awards ceremony was held in Expo Center in Karachi, Pakistan. The show was hosted by Shaan Shahid, Meera and from the members of BNN. The show had the performances by Mehreen Raheel, Faisal Qureshi, Ali Zafar, Faisal Rehman, and Mehreen Syed. Some of the film and music categories were removed from the award.

Winners and nominees

Films

Television

Music

Special

Chairperson's Lifetime Achievement Award
Mehdi Hassan

References

External links

Lux Style Awards ceremonies
2006 film awards
2006 television awards
2006 music awards
Lux
Lux